is a Japanese actor, fashion model and DJ/music producer, best known for his roles as Douji in the 2005 tokusatsu series Kamen Rider Hibiki and Bishop in the 2008 series Kamen Rider Kiva. As a DJ, Murata goes under the name "MITSUU", and has released remixes for artists such as HIGH and MIGHTY COLOR and JYONGRI. He is currently employed by Orions Belt. His blood type is A. He was married to Sayaka Kanda on April 26, 2017 until their divorce in 2019.

Filmography

Television
 Nisennen no Koi (Fuji TV, 2000) as Kai Moriet
 Sora Kara Furu Ichioku no Hoshi (Fuji TV, 2002) – episodes 1, 2
 Saigo no Bengonin (NTV, 2003) as Toshihito Nakano
 Tokumei Kakaricho Tadano Hitoshi (TV Asahi, 2003) – episode 8
 Sky High 2 (TV Asahi, 2004) – episode 8
 Vampire Host (TV Tokyo, 2004) as Katsuragi Yuji – episode 4
 Kamen Rider Hibiki (TV Asahi, 2005) as Douji, Parent Hime (Voice)
 Tissue (TV Asahi, 2007) as Saeki Naoki
 Kamen Rider Kiva (TV Asahi, 2008) as Bishop
 Kamen Rider Wizard (TV Asahi, 2013) as Naito/Legion – episode 30, 31

Cinema

 Go (2001) as Kato
 Platonic Sex (2001)
 Returner (2002)
 Eau de Vie (2003)
 Battle Royale II: Requiem (2003) as Soji Kazama
 Showa Kayo Daizenshu (2003)
 Road 88 (2004)
 Rinjin 13-go (2005)
 Irasshaimase, kanja-sama (2005)
 Kamen Rider Hibiki & The Seven Senki (2005) as Douji
 Limit of Love: Umizaru (2006) as Atsushi Kawaguchi
 Black Kiss (2006)
 TAKI183 (2006)
 Aishiau koto shika dekinai (2007)
 Kaiji (2009) as Kōji Uda

Other media

Theatre
 Himizu (2004)
 Ore ga Blue Hearts to Downtown wo suki ni natte riyuu (2007)
 Rorschach (2007)

References

External links
Orions Belt profile
Official blog

1977 births
Japanese male actors
Living people